Emeric Depussay (born 27 August 2001) is a French professional footballer who plays as a defensive midfielder for  club Bordeaux.

Career 
On 4 June 2020, Depussay signed his first professional contract with Bordeaux, a deal lasting until 30 June 2023. He made his professional debut for the club in a 3–0 Coupe de France loss to Brest on 2 January 2022.

References

External links 
 
 

2001 births
Living people
Sportspeople from Gironde
French footballers
Association football midfielders
FC Girondins de Bordeaux players
Championnat National 3 players
Ligue 2 players
Footballers from Nouvelle-Aquitaine